Art Richardson was a Major League Baseball second baseman who played in one game for the Chicago Browns in .

Richardson went hitless in four at bats in his only career game. He also made one fielding error.

References

External links

Retrosheet

Major League Baseball second basemen
Chicago Browns/Pittsburgh Stogies players
19th-century baseball players
Baseball players from Massachusetts
Year of birth missing
Year of death missing